The Human Jungle is a 1954 American film noir crime film directed by Joseph M. Newman and starring Gary Merrill, Jan Sterling and Regis Toomey. It was produced and distributed by the Hollywood studio Allied Artists.

Plot
Under pressure to clean up crime in the streets, Abe Rowan, chief of police, assigns Capt. "Danny" Danforth to take charge and restore order. Danforth assures wife Pat the dangerous assignment is strictly temporary, determined to get out of police work for good.

A murder of a striptease dancer becomes Danforth's top priority. He and second-in-command Detective Geddes cast their suspicions toward hoodlum Earl Swados, attempting to persuade another stripper, Mary Abbott, to turn state's evidence against him. After charging her with prostitution, the cops spread the word that Mary is going to inform on Swados and the local crime boss, Leonard Ustick.

Complications arise when another detective, Strauss, shoots an innocent bystander and police are falsely accused of beating three young men, causing neighborhood tensions to rise. Danforth takes a chance by releasing Mary, who had no intention of double-crossing the gangsters. Swados tries to murder her, chasing Mary through a brewery before Danforth and Geddes come to her rescue. Danforth resolves to stay on the job, no matter how long it takes.

Cast

 Gary Merrill as Police Capt. John Danforth
 Jan Sterling as Mary Abbott
 Regis Toomey as Det. Bob Geddes
 Lamont Johnson as Det. Lannigan
 Patrick Waltz as Det. Strauss 
 Chuck Connors as Earl Swados
 Paula Raymond as Pat Danforth
 Emile Meyer as Police Chief Abe Rowan
 George Wallace as Det. O'Neill
 Chubby Johnson as Greenie
 James Westerfield as Police Capt. Marty Harrison
 Florenz Ames as Leonard Ustick
 Claude Akins as George Mandy
 Booth Colman as Wallace
 Henry Kulky as Matty
 Hugh Boswell as Lynch
 Rankin Mansfield as Det. Bledsoe
 Leo Cleary as Karns, Police Fingerprint Man
 Don Keefer as Det. Cleary
 Marie Blake as 	Mrs. Ashton
 Marjorie Bennett as 	Mrs. Lee 
 Lester Dorr as 	Rudy, Salesman 
 Martha Wentworth as 	Marcy, Janitress 
 Ford Rainey as Jones 
 Vince Barnett as 	Old Mugging Victim 
 Shirley Jean Rickert as 	Stripper

References

Bibliography
 Hannan, Brian. In Theaters Everywhere: A History of the Hollywood Wide Release, 1913-2017. McFarland, 2018.

External links
 
 
 

1954 crime films
1954 films
American crime films
American black-and-white films
1950s English-language films
Allied Artists films
Films directed by Joseph M. Newman
Films scored by Hans J. Salter
1950s American films